Akihisa Makida (牧田 明久, born June 3, 1982) is a Japanese former professional baseball outfielder and currently second squad coach for the Tohoku Rakuten Golden Eagles of the Nippon Professional Baseball (NPB). He played for the Golden Eagles from 2005 to 2007 and from 2009 to 2016.

On October 14, 2019, Makita become second squad fielding coach for the Tohoku Rakuten Golden Eagles of NPB.

References

External links

NPB stats

1982 births
Living people
Baseball people from Fukui Prefecture
Japanese baseball players
Nippon Professional Baseball outfielders
Tohoku Rakuten Golden Eagles players
Japanese baseball coaches
Nippon Professional Baseball coaches
People from Echizen, Fukui